The 2014 Aegon Championships (also known traditionally as the Queen's Club Championships) was a men's tennis tournament played on outdoor grass courts. It was the 112th edition of those championships and was part of the ATP World Tour 250 series of the 2014 ATP World Tour. It took place at the Queen's Club in London, United Kingdom between 9 June and 15 June 2014. The singles title was one by fourth-seeded Grigor Dimitrov.

Points and prize money

Point distribution

Prize money 

* per team

Singles main draw entrants

Seeds

 Rankings are as of May 26, 2014.

Other entrants
The following players received wildcards into the singles main draw:
  Marcos Baghdatis
  Daniel Cox
  Daniel Evans
  James Ward
  Stan Wawrinka

The following players received entry from the qualifying draw:
  Daniel Brands
  James Duckworth
  Farrukh Dustov
  Marsel İlhan

Withdrawals
Before the tournament
  Ivan Dodig → replaced by  Aljaž Bedene
  Alejandro González → replaced by  Denis Kudla
  Jack Sock → replaced by  Somdev Devvarman

During the tournament
  Alexandr Dolgopolov

Retirements
  Marcos Baghdatis
  Jarkko Nieminen

Doubles main draw entrants

Seeds

 Rankings are as of May 26, 2014.

Other entrants
The following pairs received wildcards into the doubles main draw:
  Daniel Evans /  James Ward
  Ken Skupski /  Neal Skupski

Retirements
  Alexandr Dolgopolov (right leg injury)

Finals

Singles

  Grigor Dimitrov defeated  Feliciano López, 6–7(8–10), 7–6(7–1), 7–6(8–6)

Doubles

  Alexander Peya /  Bruno Soares defeated  Jamie Murray /  John Peers, 4–6, 7–6(7–4), [10–4]

References

External links
 Official website 
 ATP tournament profile

 
Aegon Championships
Queen's Club Championships
Aegon Championships
Aegon Championships